, son of regent Ichijō Akiyoshi, was a kugyō (court noble) of the Edo period (1603–1868) of Japan. His wife was a daughter of Ikeda Mitsumasa, the founding father of Okayama Domain, and adopted daughter of shōgun Tokugawa Iemitsu, and with her he had son Kaneteru. Unlike his father or his son Kaneteru, he did not hold any regent position, but served as Udaijin.

Family
 Father: Ichijo Akiyoshi
 Mother: Daughter of Nishinotoin Tokinao
 Wife: Seigen’in (1636-1717)
 Son: Ichijo Kaneteru

References
 

1633 births
1707 deaths
Fujiwara clan
Ichijō family